The Extraordinary and Plenipotentiary Ambassador of Peru in the Republic of Ecuador is the official representative of the Republic of Peru to the Republic of Ecuador.

As a result of the dissolution of the Republic of Colombia, the State of Ecuador was established in 1830, having been preceded by Peru in 1821. Both countries established relations in 1831, with their first treaties being signed the following year. Both countries have maintained their relations since, with one exception from 1858 to 1860, as a result of the first Ecuadorian–Peruvian War (despite the second Ecuadorian–Peruvian War in 1941, Peru and Ecuador did not sever diplomatic relations).

The dispute ended with the 1998 Brasilia Presidential Act, and relations have stabilized since.

List of representatives

See also
List of ambassadors of Peru to Colombia
List of ambassadors of Peru to Venezuela

References

Ambassadors of Peru to Ecuador
Ecuador
Peru